Wijkia is a genus of mosses belonging to the family Pylaisiadelphaceae.

The species of this genus are found in Southeastern Asia, Africa, Australia and America.

Species:
 Wijkia albescens  H.Crum, 1971
 Wijkia alboalaris  Manuel, 1981

References

Hypnales
Moss genera